The 2016 Constitution Party presidential primaries were 2 electoral contests, held in the states of Idaho and Missouri, by the Constitution Party during the 2016 election season in order to allocate delegates from those states to the 2016 Constitution Party National Convention.

Candidates
Candidates are sorted by delegate votes received at the 2016 Constitution Party National Convention.

Results

National

Idaho primary 
The Constitution Party of Idaho held its primary on March 8.

Missouri primary 

The Constitution Party of Missouri held its primary on March 15. No candidate made it on the ballot, and the only option for voters was "Uncommitted".

See also
Presidential primaries
 2016 Democratic Party presidential primaries
 2016 Green Party presidential primaries
 2016 Libertarian Party presidential primaries
 2016 Republican Party presidential primaries

References

Constitution Party (United States) presidential primaries
Constitution